Antaeotricha plumosa is a moth in the family Depressariidae. It was described by August Busck in 1914. It is found in Panama.

The forewings are yellowish brown with a violet sheen and a dark brown line from the base along the base of the dorsum, another similarly colored, zigzag line obliquely across the cell to the middle of the dorsum. There is a dark brown, nearly straight line from the middle of the costa at the tornus and an outwardly curved, dark brown line from the apical fourth to the tornus. A marginal series of black dots is found around the apex. The hindwings are light yellow fuscous, in the male with a light yellow costal hair pencil.

References

Moths described in 1914
plumosa
Moths of Central America